Claude Jarman Jr. (born September 27, 1934) is an American former child actor, entrepreneur, former executive director of the San Francisco International Film Festival and former director of Cultural Affairs for the City of San Francisco.

Early life and career
Jarman was born in Nashville, Tennessee. As a child, he acted in productions of the Nashville Community Playhouse's Children's Theater.

Jarman was 10 years old and in the fifth grade in Nashville when he was discovered in a nationwide talent search by MGM Studios, and was cast as the lead actor in the film The Yearling (1946).

His performance received glowing reviews and he received a special Academy Award as outstanding child actor of 1946 as a result. He continued his studies at the MGM studio school, and made a total of 11 films.  By the time he reached his early twenties he chose to leave his film career behind. Republic Studios cast him in a couple of B-movies, but discouraged, he moved back to Tennessee to finish college at Vanderbilt University.
Following coursework in pre-law at Vanderbilt, Jarman appeared in Disney's The Great Locomotive Chase (1956), his final movie. After that, he served three years in the U.S. Navy, doing public relations work.

Jarman moved to working behind the scenes. He ran the San Francisco International Film Festival for 15 years (1965–1980) and was known for his in-depth retrospectives of movie stars and directors. He was executive producer of the music documentary film Fillmore (1972), about rock impresario Bill Graham.

He briefly returned to acting in 1978 in the television miniseries Centennial. He was a special guest at the 70th and 75th Academy Award telecasts, in 1998 and 2003 respectively, as a past acting award winner at the Oscar Family Album retrospectives.

He served as director of cultural affairs for the City of San Francisco. He founded Jarman Travel Inc. in 1986 to serve the travel needs of corporations and executives.

Jarman wrote My Life and the Final Days of Hollywood, which was published in 2018.

Personal life
Jarman married his first wife, Virginia, in 1959. They had three children: Elizabeth Suddeth, Claude Jarman III and Murray Jarman, before their 1968 divorce. Jarman married his second wife, Maryann, in 1968. They had two daughters together, Vanessa Getty and Natalie Jarman, before their 1983 divorce. Jarman married his current wife, Katharine, in 1986, with whom he has twin daughters, Charlotte and Sarah.

Filmography

References

Further reading

 Holmstrom, John (1996). The Moving Picture Boy: An International Encyclopaedia from 1895 to 1995. Norwich: Michael Russell, p. 189-190.
 Dye, David (1988). Child and Youth Actors: Filmography of Their Entire Careers, 1914–1985. Jefferson, NC: McFarland & Co.,  pp. 115–116.

External links
 

1934 births
Living people
American male child actors
American male film actors
Academy Juvenile Award winners
20th-century American male actors
Male actors from Nashville, Tennessee
Metro-Goldwyn-Mayer contract players